Hilda is a hamlet in southern Alberta, Canada within Cypress County, located  east of Highway 41, approximately  northeast of Medicine Hat. In 1910, the post master named the post office "Hilda" after his infant daughter.

Demographics 

See also 
List of communities in Alberta
List of designated places in Alberta
List of hamlets in Alberta

References 

Cypress County
Hamlets in Alberta
Designated places in Alberta